Stephen Malkin (June 20, 1941 – August 19, 2013) was an American engineer. He taught at the University of Texas at Austin, the University at Buffalo, the University of Massachusetts Amherst, and Technion – Israel Institute of Technology.

Malkin's research work was in manufacturing with a focus on grinding and abrasive processes. He was elected a member of the National Academy of Engineering (NAE), “for pioneering research in and the implementation of grinding-system simulation and optimization”.

Malkin was also a Fellow of the International Institution for Production Engineering (CIRP), a Fellow of the American Society of Mechanical Engineers (ASME), and a Fellow of the Society of Manufacturing Engineering (SME).

Early life and education 
Stephen Malkin was born in Malden, Massachusetts and grew up in the Boston area. In 1963 he graduated in Mechanical Engineering from the Massachusetts Institute of Technology (MIT). In 1965 he received his M.S. degree and in 1968 - his Sc.D., both from MIT. His Sc.D. advisor was Nathan Cook, and his thesis topic: “The Wear of Grinding Wheels”.

Career 
Malkin joined the Department of Mechanical Engineering at the University of Texas at Austin in 1968, as an assistant professor and was later promoted to associate professor. In 1974 he was an associate professor at the Department of Mechanical Engineering of the State University of New York, Buffalo. In 1976 Malkin joined, as tenured associate professor, the faculty of Mechanical Engineering at Technion - Israel Institute of Technology.

In 1986 Malkin joined the Department of Mechanical and Industrial Engineering at the University of Massachusetts Amherst as a full professor. In 2000 Malkin was appointed as the first Head of the Department of Mechanical & Industrial Engineering, which merged the scholarly activity of two separate departments: Mechanical Engineering and Industrial Engineering. He was the department Head during 2000–2006.  Malkin was a Distinguished University Professor from 1998 until he retired in 2008 as a Distinguished Professor Emeritus.

During his career, Malkin was a visiting professor at the Technion, the School of Mechanical and Aerospace Engineering at Cornell University, University of California, Berkeley and at the Indian Institute of Technology, Madras. He was a consultant to more than 35 industrial companies in the USA, Europe, Israel, China, Korea, Japan, India and Brazil.

Malkin was the editor for North America of the Journal of Manufacturing Science and Production during 2003 - 2005, and an associate editor of Trans. ASME, Journal of Engineering for Industry. During his career, Malkin supervised 50 graduate students.

Research 
Malkin's main field was manufacturing and materials processing, with special emphasis  on grinding and abrasive processes. His early research focused on developing models to describe the grinding process: the mechanics, precision, surface topography, temperatures and thermal wear.

He was the first to develop and demonstrate adaptive control for grinding operations (at the Technion, Israel), which can be practically utilized for enhancing grinding operations in real-time.

He then developed a virtual manufacturing system that provides quantitative and computerized simulation of the grinding process. This system can predict the outcome and calculate the optimal conditions, and is used by the industry. His latest research focused on the grinding process optimization and intelligent control of grinding machines.

Publications 
Malkin authored more than 200 scientific papers and a book that had two editions. He held two patents.

Books 
 Stephen Malkin, Grinding Technology: Theory and Applications of Machining with Abrasives (Industrial Press, 1989).  ISBN 978-0470213254
 S. Malkin and C. Guo, Grinding Technology: Theory and Applications of Machining with Abrasives (Industrial Press, 2008).  ISBN 978-0-8347-7  (updated and enhanced version of the first book)

Selected articles 
 S Malkin, NH Cook: The wear of grinding wheels: Part 2–Fracture wear.  ASME Journal of Manufacturing Science and Engineering. Vol. 93(4), 1971.
 S Malkin, Y. Koren:  Off-Line Grinding Optimization with a Micro-Computer.  CIRP Annals, Vol 29(1), pp. 213–216, 1980
 S Malkin: Grinding Cycle Optimization. CIRP Annals, Vol 30(1), pp. 213–216, 1981.
 G Amitay, S. Malkin, Y. Koren: Adaptive control optimization of grinding.  J. Eng. Ind. Trans ASME 103(1), pp. 103–108, 1981.  
 S Malkin JE Ritter: Grinding mechanisms and strength degradation for ceramics. ASME Journal of Manufacturing Science and Engineering. Vol. 111(2), 1989.
 S Malkin, TW Hwang: Grinding mechanisms for ceramics.  CIRP Annals, Vol. 45(2), pp. 569–580, 1996.
 G. Guo, S Malkin: Energy partition and cooling during grinding. J. of Manufacturing Processes. Vol. 2 (3), pp. 151–157, 2000.
 S. Dong, K. Danai, S. Malkin, A Deshmukh: Continuous optimal Infeed control for Cylindrical Plunge Grinding, Part 1: Methodology. ASME J. of Manufacturing Science and Engineering. Vol. 126(2), 2004.
 S. Malkin, C. Guo: Thermal Analysis of grinding. CIRP Annals, Vol 56(2), pp. 760–782, 2007.
 AJ Shih, BL Tai, L. Zhang, S. Sullivan, S. Malkin: Prediction of bond grinding temperature in skull base neurosurgery, CIRP Annals, Vol. 61(1), pp. 307–310, 2012

Honors and awards 

 Honorary Doctorate Degree (Doctor Honoris Causa), J. E. Purkyně University, Czech Republic, 2010
 Member, National Academy of Engineering (NAE), 2008
 Founders Lecturer, North American Manufacturing Research Conference, Monterrey, Mexico, 2008
 Life Fellow, American Society of Mechanical Engineers (ASME), 2006
 Honorary Professor, National Huaqiao University, Quanzhou, China, 2001
 Honorary Member, Romanian Society of Mechanical Engineering, 1993
 Fellow, Society of Manufacturing Engineers (SME), 1989
 Fellow, American Society of Mechanical Engineers (ASME), 1987
 Fellow, International Academy for Production Engineering (CIRP), 1980

Stephen Malkin Lecture 
The Mechanical & Industrial Engineering Department at the  University of Massachusetts Amherst holds an annual "Stephen Malkin Lecture", that attracts expert speakers in the fields related to Professor Malkin's research. The first Malkin Lecture was in April 2015.

Personal life 
Malkin was married to Maccabit (Gross). They raised a son, Gonen, and a daughter, Ruth. He died in 2013 and was buried in Tivon, Israel. A grinding wheel is graved on the gravestone.

References

External links 

 Stephen Malkin’s page at the University of Massachusetts Amherst
 Stephen Malkin’s memorial page at the University of Massachusetts Amherst
 Stephen Malkin’s page and memorial tribute at the National Academy of Engineering

1941 births
2013 deaths
Fellows of the American Society of Mechanical Engineers
Members of the United States National Academy of Engineering
University of Massachusetts Amherst faculty
Massachusetts Institute of Technology alumni
University of Texas at Austin faculty
University at Buffalo faculty
Academic staff of Technion – Israel Institute of Technology
People from Malden, Massachusetts
American expatriates in Israel
Engineers from Massachusetts
20th-century American engineers